Wang Yichun (王一淳, born 4 April 2005) is a Chinese swimmer. She competed in the women's 50 metre butterfly event at the 2018 Asian Games, winning the silver medal.

References

External links
 

2005 births
Living people
Chinese female butterfly swimmers
Place of birth missing (living people)
Asian Games medalists in swimming
Asian Games silver medalists for China
Swimmers at the 2018 Asian Games
Medalists at the 2018 Asian Games
Medalists at the FINA World Swimming Championships (25 m)
21st-century Chinese women